Norbert Zafimahova (born 13 June 1913 in Farafangana, Madagascar; died 3 April 1974) was a politician from Madagascar who served in the French Senate from 1948–1958.

He was President of the Constituent and Legislative Assembly of Madagascar 1958–1959.

References

Malagasy politicians
French Senators of the Fourth Republic
1913 births
1974 deaths
Senators of French East Africa
People from Atsimo-Atsinanana
Presidents of the National Assembly (Madagascar)